Tony Peña is a former catcher for the Pittsburgh Pirates and coach for the New York Yankees.

Tony Peña may also refer to:

 Tony Peña Jr. (born 1981), his son, pitcher for the Boston Red Sox
 Tony Peña (pitcher) (born 1982), pitcher for the Chicago White Sox
 Villano IV, professional wrestler who used the ringname Tony Pena briefly in World Championship Wrestling

See also
 Antonio Peña (disambiguation)